Joseph Anthony Jr.,  (January 15, 1762 - August 5, 1814) was a noted American silversmith.

Early life
Anthony was born in Newport, Rhode Island, the son of a successful sea captain and merchant who relocated to Philadelphia around 1783, and first cousin of painter Gilbert Stuart.

Career
He trained as a silversmith and became a successful business owner in Philadelphia, selling both his own wares and imported fine goods, and prominent in local society. From 1810 to 1814 he partnered with his sons, Michael and Thomas Anthony, as J. Anthony & Sons. He was one of the original subscribers to the Philadelphia City Dancing Assembly Fund.

Personal life
In 1785, he married Henrietta Hillegas (b. 1766), one of ten children of Michael Hillegas, first Treasurer of the United States, and his wife, Henrietta Hillegas of Philadelphia.  Hillegas made his fortune in sugar refining and iron manufacturing.

References 

 Love and Loss: American Portrait and Mourning Miniatures, Robin Jaffee Frank, Gibbes Museum of Art, Yale University Press, 2000, page 163. (Also see portrait of Anthony on page 161.)
 Metropolitan Museum of Art
 Ancestry.com

1762 births
1814 deaths
American silversmiths
People from Newport, Rhode Island
People of colonial Rhode Island
Colonial American merchants